Kenneth Mobley Brice Jr. (born June 10, 1979), known professionally as Lee Brice, is an American country music singer and songwriter, signed to Curb Records. Brice has released five albums with the label: Love Like Crazy, Hard to Love, I Don't Dance, Lee Brice. and Hey World. He has also released eighteen singles, of which eight have reached number one on Billboard Country Airplay: "A Woman Like You", "Hard to Love", "I Drive Your Truck", "I Don't Dance", "Rumor", "I Hope You're Happy Now", "One of Them Girls" and "Memory I Don't Mess With". He has also charted within the top 10 with "Love Like Crazy", "Parking Lot Party", "Drinking Class", and "That Don't Sound Like You". "Love Like Crazy" was the top country song of 2010 according to Billboard Year-End, and broke a 62-year-old record for the longest run on the country chart.

Besides his own material, he has also co-written singles for artists like Garth Brooks, Adam Gregory, the Eli Young Band, and Tim McGraw. One of his compositions, Brooks's "More Than a Memory", was the first song ever to debut at number one on the country chart, while the Eli Young Band's "Crazy Girl" was the Billboard Year-End top country song of 2011.

Biography
Kenneth Mobley Brice, Jr. was born on June 10, 1979, in Sumter, South Carolina, to Kenneth, Sr. and Carleen Brice His younger brother, Lewis, was a contestant on Season 1 of Country Music Television's Can You Duet. As a child, he played piano and guitar, sang in church, and wrote his own songs. He entered and won three different talent contests in high school.

He attended Clemson University on a football scholarship . He played special teams there as the long snapper, but after an arm injury, he decided to focus on a country music career.

Musical career

By 2007, Brice began working as a songwriter, with cuts by Jason Aldean, Keith Gattis, and Cowboy Crush among others. Along with Billy Montana and Kyle Jacobs, he co-wrote Garth Brooks's 2007 single "More Than a Memory", the first single in the history of the Billboard Hot Country Songs chart to debut at number one.

Also in 2007, he signed to Curb Records, releasing his debut single "She Ain't Right", which peaked at number 29 on the country chart. It was followed by "Happy Endings" and "Upper Middle Class White Trash" at numbers 32 and 44. All three songs were to have been included on an album entitled Picture of Me, which was never released. He continued to write songs for others, including Canadian singer Adam Gregory's singles "Crazy Days" and "What It Takes". He appeared on Cledus T. Judd's 2007 album Boogity, Boogity – A Tribute to the Comedic Genius of Ray Stevens, singing duet vocals on a rendition of the Albert E. Brumley gospel song "Turn Your Radio On".

2009–2010: Love Like Crazy
In August 2009, he charted with his fourth single, "Love Like Crazy", a song written by Tim James and Doug Johnson. It was the first release from his debut album of the same name, on which he co-produced all but one track with Johnson. "Love Like Crazy" reached top 10 on the Hot Country Songs chart in July 2010 during its forty-sixth week on the chart, setting a record for the slowest climb into the top 10. In September 2010, the song charted for a fifty-sixth week, making it the longest-charting song in the chart's history; it broke a record set by Eddy Arnold, whose 1948 single "Bouquet of Roses" spent fifty-four weeks on the chart. "Love Like Crazy" ultimately peaked at number 3. The album's second single was "Beautiful Every Time" at number 30. Also in 2010, Brice co-wrote labelmate Tim McGraw's single "Still".

2011–2019: Hard 2 Love, I Don't Dance and Lee Brice

Brice released his sixth single, "A Woman Like You", in late 2011. It was the first release from a second album for Curb, Hard 2 Love, which was released on April 24, 2012. In April 2012, it became his first number one on the Country Airplay chart. "Hard to Love" became his second number one in late 2012. The album's third single, "I Drive Your Truck", was released on December 3, 2012, and reached number one on the Country Airplay chart in 2013. The album's fourth single, "Parking Lot Party", was released to country radio on May 13, 2013, and peaked at number 6 on the Country Airplay chart in November 2013. Brice also co-produced the single "Love Is War" for the duo American Young, a duo whose membership includes "A Woman Like You" co-writer Jon Stone.

In early 2014, Brice released the single "I Don't Dance". It was the lead single to his third studio album of the same name, which was released on September 9, 2014. Brice produced the album by himself. "I Don't Dance" became Brice's fourth number one hit in August 2014. "Drinking Class" is the album's second single. it peaked at number two on the Country Airplay chart in May 2015. The album's third single, "That Don't Sound Like You" released to country radio on May 11, 2015. During this time, he also toured on a very busy schedule, doing over 100 live shows every year between 2011 and 2016.

On November 3, 2017, Brice released the self-titled album, Lee Brice. It is his fourth album and it was released via Curb Records. The album's lead single is "Boy" and features 14 other songs.

In October 2019, Carly Pearce released a duet with Brice titled "I Hope You're Happy Now."

2020–present: Hey World
In April 2020, Brice released the single, "One of Them Girls", as the lead-off single to his fifth studio album, Hey World, due for release November 20, 2020. "One of Them Girls" spent three weeks at number one on the Billboard Country Airplay chart in October 2020, becoming Brice's longest-lasting number one to date. In early 2023, is set to embark on his headlining "Beer Drinking Opportunity Tour" in Canada, alongside Tenille Arts and Josh Ross.

Personal life
In April 2013, Brice married his longtime girlfriend Sara Nanette Reeveley. The couple have three children: sons Takoda Brice (born in 2008) and Ryker Mobley Brice (born in 2013), and daughter Trulee Nanette Brice (born in 2017). Brice's cousin and often music inspiration, Michael Cericola, serves as the children's godfather. Reeveley is featured on the track "See About a Girl" on Hard 2 Love.

On November 8, 2020, Brice announced that he tested positive for COVID-19 during the ongoing pandemic, but was asymptomatic. As a result, he was unable to perform with Carly Pearce on their single, "I Hope You're Happy Now", at the 54th CMA Awards, and Charles Kelley of Lady A performed with Pearce instead.

Discography

Studio albums
 Love Like Crazy (2010)
 Hard 2 Love (2012)
 I Don't Dance (2014)
 Lee Brice (2017)
 Hey World (2020)

Songs written by Lee Brice

Awards and nominations

References

External links

Official Lee Brice Website

1979 births
Living people
American country singer-songwriters
Clemson University alumni
Curb Records artists
People from Sumter, South Carolina
21st-century American singers
Country musicians from South Carolina
Singer-songwriters from South Carolina